Coccoloba padiformis is a plant species in the genus Coccoloba. It is distributed in Mesoamerica and northern South America.

References

padiformis
Flora of Central America
Flora of northern South America